The Rožanc Award is a literary award in Slovenia awarded each year for the best collection of essays in Slovene. It has been bestowed since 1993. It is named after the author, playwright and journalist Marjan Rožanc.

Rožanc Award laureates

References

Slovenian literary awards
Awards established in 1993